Ephrem Marie M'Bom (18 July 1954 – 20 September 2020) was a Cameroonian professional footballer. He competed for the Cameroon national football team at the 1982 FIFA World Cup.

Club career
M'Bom began playing football with Rail FC of Douala in 1973 as an attacking player. He would move to left back in 1975, and play as a defender for Eclair Douala, Léoprad Douala, Canon Yaoundé and Dragon Yaoundé until he retired in 1989. Nicknamed Wire due to his slender build, he won five league titles with Canon as well as two Champions Cups and a Cup Winners Cup.

International career
M'Bom made several appearances for the Cameroon national football team, participating in the 1982 African Cup of Nations finals.

Personal life
After retiring as a player, Mbom worked for the national railway company. He died on September 20, 2020 at the age of 66 from a tumor in his leg.

Honours
Cameroonian Championship: 5
 1979, 1980, 1982, 1985, 1986

Cameroonian Cup: 3
 1978, 1983, 1986

African Champions' Cup: 2
 1978, 1980

African Cup Winners' Cup: 1
 1979

References

External links

Mbom Ephrem, latéral gauche des Lions Indomptables lors du Mondial 82, est décédé (Bio) - Camfoot 

1954 births
2020 deaths
Footballers from Yaoundé
Association football defenders
Cameroonian footballers
Cameroon international footballers
1982 African Cup of Nations players
1982 FIFA World Cup players
1984 African Cup of Nations players
Africa Cup of Nations-winning players
Canon Yaoundé players
Elite One players